Stadio Raul Guidobaldi is an athletics stadium located in Rieti, Italy. Every year since 1971 the stadium hosts the Rieti Meeting; it also hosted the 2013 European Athletics Junior Championships.

The stadium is notable for being the location where eight world records were settled (the most famous being the 9"74 score in the 100 metres by Asafa Powell in 2007); for this reason, Steve Cram defined the stadium a sort of Mecca for middle-distance runners.

History 

The stadium was built as part of the construction program for the 1960 Summer Olympics and inaugurated on 23 July 1960. In the 1980s a second grandstand and a marquee with an indoor track were built. In 1999 a roof was built for the main grandstand and the track was expanded to eight lanes. In 2011-2012 all tracks were rebuilt in sportflex material and painted in blue by company Mondo.

Description 
The stadium is located in south-west Rieti, near other sport facilities, and is bordered by the Velino river. The main track is made of sportflex and is 8 lane wide. Along each straight is a grandstand, with a total capacity of 5,000 spectators: the main one, called "Velino", has a roof supported by large steel arches and also hosts the changing rooms and the press station; the smaller one is called "Terminillo" and is not covered.

Behind the main track is an area reserved to training and warming up, with a 250-metres-long 6-lane track, an area equipped for the long jump and javelin, and a marquee with an heated indoor track for winter trainings.

References

Sports venues in Italy
Athletics (track and field) venues in Italy
Sports venues in Lazio
Rieti